Challenger is a non-releasable bald eagle in the care of the non-profit American Eagle Foundation. He is the first bald eagle in history trained to free fly over stadium events, including the World Series and United States presidential inaugurations.

Life
At some point, during a storm in 1989, Challenger was blown from his nest as an eaglet. He was found and fed by well-meaning humans who placed him with a rehabilitation program. During his early years, he experienced too much human contact and imprinted on his human handlers. Two unsuccessful release attempts resulted in Challenger being deemed non-releasable, and he was eventually being handed over to the Federal authorities. Authorities have since given Challenger to the American Eagle Foundation for care and educational programs. He lives with other birds of prey at in Pigeon Forge, Tennessee. Challenger is named in honor of the space shuttle crew, who were killed when it disintegrated shortly after launch.  

In 2019, on Challenger's 30th birthday, American Eagle Foundation announced that the eagle would be retired from free flights and make only gloved appearances.

Awareness
Challenger has been an ambassador for his species since 1993. He has raised a great level of public awareness for the habitat destruction of the bald eagle. When the bald eagle was taken off the Endangered Species List, Challenger represented his species during the delisting ceremony at the White House.

Performances

Sports events
MLB World Series – 1998, 2000, 2001, 2002, 2003
NFL Pro Bowl – 2002, 2003, 2004; NFC Championship Game - 2018
Fiesta Bowl – 1999, 2013
Men's Final Four – 2005
NCAA College Football National Championship – 2011, 2017
Daytona 500 – 2015
Army-Tulane Football Game – 2015
 Arizona Cardinals–San Francisco 49ers Football Game – 2016
 Cotton Bowl Classic Bowl - 2017

Teams 

Atlanta Braves
Arizona Cardinals
Auburn University
Boston College Eagles
Philadelphia Eagles
Chicago Cubs
University of Connecticut
San Francisco Giants
Green Bay Packers
Buffalo Bills
Florida Marlins
Indianapolis Colts
Texas Rangers
Kansas City Chiefs
Minnesota Vikings
New York Yankees
Oklahoma State University
Detroit Lions
Tennessee Titans
University of Kansas
University of Tennessee
Florida State University
Louisiana State University
Carson-Newman University
Georgia Southern University
United States Military Academy

Individual events 
1996 Paralympics
Disney's Animal Kingdom Grand Opening 
World War II Memorial groundbreaking ceremony
White House ceremonies
High Point University Graduation Ceremonies
Ceremony delisting the bald eagle as an endangered species
University of Kansas vs. University of Nebraska 3 NOV 2001
2007 Texas vs. Oklahoma State football game
We Are One: The Obama Inaugural Celebration at the Lincoln Memorial, January 18, 2009
October 2, 2010, Boston College vs. Notre Dame Football Game
May 19, 2014, Boston College Commencement ceremony
Horatio Alger Association Award Ceremony 2014
 HP Communications, Inc. Company Christmas Party- San Diego, CA- 2017

See also
 List of individual birds

References

External links
  Challenger's Home Page

1989 animal births
Individual eagles